Knock Knock is a 2015 erotic psychological thriller film directed by Eli Roth, who also co-wrote the script with Guillermo Amoedo and Nicolás López. The film stars Keanu Reeves, Lorenza Izzo and Ana de Armas. The film was released on October 9, 2015, by Lionsgate Premiere. Knock Knock is a remake of the 1977 film Death Game, which was directed by Peter S. Traynor and starred Sondra Locke and Colleen Camp. All three individuals had a hand in the production of Knock Knock, while Camp also had a cameo in the newer film.

Plot
Happily married architect Evan Webber is spending Father's Day weekend at home with a shoulder injury while his wife Karen and two children go on a beach trip. Karen, an artist, leaves her assistant Louis in charge of her sculpture that needs to be moved to an art gallery. During a rainstorm on the first night, two young women, Genesis and Bell, knock on Evan's door asking for help finding a party. Evan allows them in to dry off and use the Internet to get hold of the party's host.

Evan orders an Uber for the girls, who become overly flirtatious with him and seem reluctant to leave. When their driver arrives Evan finds them nude in the bathroom and tries to convince them to leave, but they kneel and begin fellating him. He gives in and has a threesome with them. The next morning, Evan finds the girls have vandalized his wife's sculpture and tells them to leave. Karen's friend Vivian stops by and sees him with Genesis. When Evan threatens to report a break-in, the girls give in and agree to be taken home. He returns them home, cleans up their mess and tries to get back to his work when the girls break in and knock him out with one of his wife's sculptures.

The girls tell Evan they are underage and threaten to FaceTime his wife unless he agrees to do what they demand. After being tied to his bed and raped by Bell role-playing as a schoolgirl in his daughter's school uniform, Evan tries to escape but is stabbed with a fork by Genesis and she and Bell tie him to a chair. Louis arrives to collect the sculpture to find Evan tied up and the girls smashing the vandalized sculpture. Louis starts to have an asthma attack and realizes the girls have taken his inhaler, while trying to get it back he falls, hits his head and dies. The girls make Louis' corpse into a sculpture and use his phone to make it look like Evan murdered Louis after discovering an affair with his wife. 

Evan is further tormented and tortured by the girls, who force him to play hide and seek. He makes an attempt to escape from the house, but is held at gunpoint by Genesis. She and Bell then tell him they have killed other men, and that he will die at dawn. At dawn the next day they tie Evan up with a hose and bury him up to his head in the back yard. Laughing hysterically, they reveal that the entire ordeal was merely a "game", as they never intended to kill Evan, nor are either of them underage. Everything they did was part of a wicked hobby of seducing, victimizing, and ruining the homes of married men with children. Genesis uploads a video of Bell raping him to his Facebook profile and the two leave with his dog, Monkey. Karen and the kids arrive home; seeing the house ruined, Evan's son, Jake, says, "Daddy had a party."

In an alternate ending, Evan takes his revenge by tracking the girls at another victim's house via Monkey's GPS tracker on his collar. He knocks on the door and the girls ask 'Who's there?'.

Cast

Production
On April 4, 2014, Keanu Reeves was added to the cast to play Evan Webber. Chilean actress Ignacia Allamand also joined the film. The shooting took place in Santiago de Chile. Eli Roth stated that filming in Chile is easier than in the United States.

Release
Knock Knock premiered at the 2015 Sundance Film Festival on January 23, 2015. Three days later, Lionsgate acquired the distribution rights to the film. The film was  released on October 9, 2015, in the United States.

Home media
Knock Knock was released on DVD and Blu-ray on December 8, 2015.

Critical reception
On Metacritic, the film has a score of 53 out of 100, based on 22 critics, indicating that it received "mixed or average reviews". Rotten Tomatoes reports an approval rating of 37%, based on 75 reviews, with an average rating of 5.3/10. The site's consensus states: "Knock Knock brings a lot of talent to bear on its satirical approach to torture horror, but not effectively enough to overcome its repetitive story or misguidedly campy tone."

Dread Central awarded it a score of four out of five, saying "what we do have is a home invasion film for the social media generation (yes, it does feature social media in its plot) that should make you think twice before offering warmth and shelter to a stranger on a dark and stormy night."

Jeff Bond of Geek magazine praised Reeves' performance, saying, "his [dramatic] turn in [the film]... helps make the movie easily Roth's best work."

See also
 List of films featuring home invasions

References

External links
 
 
 
 

2015 films
Remakes of American films
Chilean thriller drama films
English-language Chilean films
2010s English-language films
American psychological thriller films
2010s psychological thriller films
2015 psychological thriller films
Films directed by Eli Roth
Films produced by Eli Roth
Films shot in Chile
Home invasions in film
Films with screenplays by Eli Roth
Horror film remakes
Films about adultery in the United States
Films about threesomes
2010s American films
2010s Chilean films